Pedro Álvarez (born 5 May 1970) is a Colombian retired professional association football player.

Biography

MetroStars 
Pedro Álvarez was signed by the MetroStars after receiving an allocation from D.C. United in a trade between the clubs.

Statistics

References

External links 
 Profile on MetroFanatic
 

1970 births
Living people
People from Itagüí
Colombian footballers
Association football midfielders
Independiente Medellín footballers
Colombia international footballers
Atlético Junior footballers
Atlético Nacional footballers
Envigado F.C. players
New York Red Bulls players
Once Caldas footballers
Categoría Primera A players
Major League Soccer players
Sportspeople from Antioquia Department